Naushad Iqbal (born 16 February 2002) is a Bangladeshi cricketer. In February 2019, he was selected by Bangladesh Krira Shikkha Protishtan in the players' draft for the 2018–19 Dhaka Premier Division Twenty20 Cricket League. He made his Twenty20 debut for Bangladesh Krira Shikkha Protishtan in the 2018–19 Dhaka Premier Division Twenty20 Cricket League on 25 February 2019, taking one wicket for seventeen runs. He made his List A debut for Bangladesh Krira Shikkha Protishtan in the 2018–19 Dhaka Premier Division Cricket League on 8 March 2019.

References

External links
 

2002 births
Living people
Bangladeshi cricketers
Bangladesh Krira Shikkha Protishtan cricketers
Place of birth missing (living people)